Max Thomas (born 25 September 1930) is a former Australian rules footballer who played for the Carlton Football Club in the Victorian Football League (VFL).

Notes

External links 

Max Thomas's profile at Blueseum

1930 births
Carlton Football Club players
Living people
Australian rules footballers from Victoria (Australia)